Motor Boats Monthly was a monthly magazine about motorboats published by IPC Media and is listed in the Writers' & Artists' Yearbook 2014.

History and profile
Motor Boats Monthly was launched in 1987. The founders were Emrhys Barrell and Jeremy Paxton. Its first editor was Emrhys Barrell and its final editor Rob Peake. 
During the 1990s and noughties Motor Boats Monthly was Britain's best-selling motor boating magazine, hitting record ABC figures between 2005 and 2009 under the editorship of first Simon Collis, then Carl Richardson. 
Following the recession and a final change of editor, the magazine ended its print in October 2014.

References

External links
 

Monthly magazines published in the United Kingdom
Sports magazines published in the United Kingdom
Defunct magazines published in the United Kingdom
English-language magazines
Magazines established in 1982
Magazines disestablished in 2014
Sailing magazines